The Jonbenét was an American noise rock outfit from Houston, Texas. The group is named after the murdered child JonBenét Ramsey. The band played their first show as Jonbenét on August 22, 2003. After several self-released EPs and tours in the US and Canada, the band caught the attention of Pluto Records, an independent record label from Texas. The Plot Thickens EP was released on Pluto Records July 22, 2005. It was a re-mastered compilation of material from their self-released EPs and split 7-inch releases. In January 2006, the band recorded their first full-length entitled Ugly/Heartless, which The Stranger described as a "spastic, angular wall of post-hardcore noise". On August 10, 2009, the band announced a string of final shows, insinuating the band will no longer continue. The last show was played December 19, 2009, at Walter's in Houston, Texas.

The band's name attracted negative attention after John Mark Karr, who was alleged to have killed Ramsey (but was later acquitted), was arrested.

Band members
 Michael Murland - vocals
 Dann Miller - guitar
 J. Andrew Ireland - drums
 Bryan Schutmaat - bass
 Wil Spent - bass
 Chris Goodwin - bass
 Andrew Saleeba - drums
 Grant Miller - bass

Discography
Studio albums
 Ugly/Heartless (August 8, 2006)

EPs and splits
 "Five Stories Retold" (August 3, 2004)
 The Kidnap Soundtrack / The Jonbenet split single (January 2005)
 The Plot Thickens (July 25, 2005)
 "Devil Music, Volume I" 7-inch (April 17, 2007)
 Substances EP (2009)

References

External links 
 The Jonbenét on BandCamp
 [ The Jonbenet on AllMusic]

American post-hardcore musical groups
Killing of JonBenét Ramsey
Musical groups from Houston
Musical groups established in 2003
Musical groups disestablished in 2009
2003 establishments in Texas
2009 disestablishments in Texas